Saint-Guilhem-le-Désert Abbey or Gellone Abbey is a Benedictine abbey in Saint-Guilhem-le-Désert, Hérault in France. It was founded in 804 by an Aquitanian aristocrat of the Carolingian era, William of Gellone (c. 742-812), known in Occitan as 'Guilhelm'. It was listed as a historic monument by France in 1840 and as part of the Routes of Santiago de Compostela in France World Heritage Site in 1998.

External links
http://www.art-roman.net/saintguilhem/saintguilhem.htm

Benedictine monasteries in France
9th century in France
Churches completed in 804